Muraenesox is a small genus of eels found throughout the Indo-Pacific. It currently has two described species as most species have been moved to other genera. Members  are found in the Indo-West Pacific.

Species
 Muraenesox bagio (F. Hamilton, 1822) (Common Pike Conger)
 Muraenesox cinereus (Forsskål, 1775) (Daggertooth Pike Conger)

References

 Van der Land, J.; Costello, M.J.; Zavodnik, D.; Santos, R.S.; Porteiro, F.M.; Bailly, N.; Eschmeyer, W.N.; Froese, R. (2001). Pisces, in: Costello, M.J. et al. (Ed.) (2001). European register of marine species: a check-list of the marine species in Europe and a bibliography of guides to their identification. Collection Patrimoines Naturels, 50: pp. 357–374

Muraenesocidae